Salam Shaker Ali Dad (born 31 July 1986) is a former Iraqi professional footballer of who played for Al-Talaba. He played for the Iraq national football team until 2016. He was part of the Iraqi team that finished fourth in the 2015 AFC Asian Cup. Salam was first called up to the Iraqi B team in the 2007 King's Cup. He played his first international match against Jordan in a friendly on 24 January 2008.

Personal life
Salam is of Kurdish descent from the Feyli tribe.

He is the son of Iraqi international defender, Shaker Ali Dad, who played for the national team and Al-Talaba club in the 1970s and the 1980s.

Club career

Al Karkh

Salam started his career at Baghdad based club Al-Karkh SC before transferring to Al Shorta SC in 2004

Al Shorta
Shakir started all six of Al-Shorta's 2005 AFC Champions League matches, being subbed off in only one of them. He was signed by Iraqi Premier League club Al-Talaba in 2005.

Al Talaba
Salam signed for Al Talaba in 2005 for one season, playing 19 times and scoring one goal.

Erbil
Salam moved to Kurdish club Erbil in 2006. He remained there for two seasons where he won 2 league titles.

Al Khor
In 2008 Salam joined Qatari Club Al Khor. He remained there for over 7 years and played more than a century of matches.

Second stint at Al Shorta
Salam returned briefly to Al Shorta in 2015 and remained for one season where Al Shorta finished 3rd in the league.

Al Fateh
Salam signed for Saudi club Al-Fateh FC in 2015. He made his debut against Khaleej FC on 20 August of that year. He scored his first goal for the club in a 1–0 victory over Al-Taawoun FC in April 2016. Al Fateh narrowly avoided relegation in his first season for the club. Salam and Al Fateh mutually agreed to terminate the contract, citing player's personal reasons to do so.

Al-Ittihad Kalba
On 4 July 2016, it was announced that Al-Ittihad Kalba SC would sign Salam Shaker on a free transfer. Salam was named captain of the team for the 2016/17 AGL Season. He scored his first goal for the club on 15 April 2017.

International career
Shakir represented the former Iraqi Olympic side that won the silver medal at the 2006 Asian Games at Doha, and he was called into the national B team for the 2007 King's Cup in Thailand. His debut with the senior team came in January 2008, when he played a defensive role in Iraq's 1–1 friendly draw with Jordan.

Shakir made two appearances in Iraq's qualifying campaign for the 2010 FIFA World Cup in South Africa. He played the entirety of the 1–1 draw against China before starting again in the 1–0 loss to Qatar.

Shakir later became a frequent starter for Iraq. He would be first choice center back with Ali Rhema. Shaker played in all the 2014 World Cup qualification matches.

Salam Shaker was the starting center back for Iraq in the 2015 Asian cup as the team finished fourth. He scored the deciding penalty Vs Iran in the Quarter final of the competition.

On 29 March 2016, hours after captaining Iraq to a 1–0 win over Vietnam in the joint AFC and World cup qualification, Salam Shaker announced his retirement from international football, citing his reason to allow younger players the opportunity to represent the Iraqi national team.

International goals
Scores and results list Iraq's goal tally first.

Honours

Club
Erbil
Iraqi Premier League: 2006–07, 2007–08
Al-Zawraa
Iraqi Premier League: 2017–18

External links
 
 Salam Shakir on Goalzz

References

1986 births
Living people
Iraqi footballers
Iraq international footballers
2009 FIFA Confederations Cup players
2011 AFC Asian Cup players
2015 AFC Asian Cup players
Expatriate footballers in Qatar
Iraqi expatriate footballers
Iraqi expatriate sportspeople in Qatar
Al-Khor SC players
Asian Games medalists in football
Footballers at the 2006 Asian Games
Footballers at the 2014 Asian Games
Association football central defenders
Association football midfielders
Al-Fateh SC players
Al-Ittihad Kalba SC players
Al-Shorta SC players
Saudi Professional League players
Expatriate footballers in Saudi Arabia
Iraqi expatriate sportspeople in Saudi Arabia
Qatar Stars League players
UAE Pro League players
Asian Games silver medalists for Iraq
Asian Games bronze medalists for Iraq
Medalists at the 2006 Asian Games
Medalists at the 2014 Asian Games
Kurdish sportspeople